Senthang (Sethang Chin) is a Kuki-Chin-Mizo language of Burma.

Geographical distribution
Senthang is spoken in the following locations (Ethnologue).

Hakha township, Chin State
Thantlang township, Chin State (2 villages)
Gangaw township, Magway Region (15 villages)
Kalemyo township, Sagaing Region (2 villages)

VanBik (2009:55) lists the following Senthang villages: Buan Lung, Bung Tuah, Bung Zung, Chawn Cum, Cin Tlang, Dong Va, Dum Va, Hau Sen, Kei Zuan, Khua Pi, Lang Pho, Lei Um, Li Chia, Lung Hau, Lung Rang, Lung Tar, Phai Pha, Phai Zawng, Sak Ta, Sum Si, Sur Khua, Za Thal.

Dialects
Ethnologue lists the following dialects of Senthang.

Surkhua/Lungrang
Sumsi
Sakta
Central Senthang (Bungzung, Khuapi, Lei-Um, Phaipha)
Sonse

References

Ngun, Tin Par. 2016. Agreement and Verb Stem Alternation in Senthang Chin. Masters thesis, Payap University.

Kuki-Chin languages